Ernest Augustus Malet Vaughan, 5th Earl of Lisburne (1836-1888), was a prominent landowner in Cardiganshire, Wales who sought election to the British House of Commons at the 1868 General Election.

Early life
Lisburne was the son of Ernest Vaughan, 4th Earl of Lisburne, whom he succeeded on 8 November 1873, and his wife, Mary (died 1851), second daughter of Sir Laurence Palk, Bt.. As this was an Irish peerage after 1801 it did not entitle him to a seat in the House of Lords.

Family
He was married on 24 June 1858 to Gertrude Laura, third daughter of Edwyn Burnaby of Baggrave Hall, Leicestershire. She died in 1865.

Later life and death
He succeeded his father in 1873 and died in 1888. While maintaining his support for the Conservative cause he largely withdrew from active politics and played little part in county government nor the Quarter Sessions.

References

5
Ernest
Cardigan, Ceredigion
Welsh nobility
Welsh landowners